Sioux Township is a township in Platte County, in the U.S. state of Missouri.

References

Townships in Missouri
Townships in Platte County, Missouri